Nicholas "Nick" Robertson (born September 11, 2001) is an American professional ice hockey left winger for the  Toronto Maple Leafs of the National Hockey League (NHL). He was selected 53rd overall by the Maple Leafs in the 2019 NHL Entry Draft. He made his NHL debut with the Maple Leafs during the 2020 Stanley Cup playoffs, where he had 1 goal in 4 games.

Personal life
Robertson was born on September 11, 2001, in Arcadia, California, to parents Hugh and Mercedes. His mother was born in Manila, Philippines, and moved to North America as a child where she would meet her Michigan-born husband. Robertson began playing minor hockey while living in Southern California before moving to Michigan at eight years old for better hockey opportunities. Prior to the move, his parents owned season tickets to the Los Angeles Kings and he would often go to games with his brothers Jason and Michael. His older sister Brianne is also involved in athletics and is a profession jujitsu.

Playing career

Major junior
Robertson began his hockey career in Toronto with the AAA minor hockey team Toronto Red Wings in the Greater Toronto Hockey League (GTHL). He recorded 18 goals and 18 assists over 32 games for the 2016–17 season while also playing four games with the North York Rangers of the Ontario Junior Hockey League (OJHL). He received attention from the Ontario Hockey League (OHL) and was eventually drafted 17th overall by the Peterborough Petes in the 2017 OHL Draft. He played with the Petes for three seasons, scoring 55 goals and 31 assists for 86 points in his last year before the OHL season was canceled due to the coronavirus pandemic. He became the first Pete player to score 50 goals in a season since Jason Dawe and Mike Harding did in 1992–93. As a result of his successful season, Robertson received the CHL Sportsman of the Year Award and was named to the 2019–20 OHL All-Star Team. He was also selected as the Petes' nominee for the Red Tilson Trophy as OHL MVP.

Professional
Robertson was drafted by the Toronto Maple Leafs 53rd overall in the 2019 NHL Entry Draft and signed an entry level contract with the team on September 19, 2019. Upon the cancelation of the 2019–20 OHL season, he returned to Los Angeles where he continued to workout before joining the Leafs for their Return to Play initiative. He participated in the Leafs training camp prior to the 2020 Stanley Cup playoffs and made his NHL debut during qualifying rounds of the playoffs against the Columbus Blue Jackets. Upon making his debut, he became the youngest player on all NHL rosters for the Qualifiers and youngest ever in the postseason since April 21, 1996, when Jarome Iginla made his professional debut. A few days later, on August 6, in Game 3 of the Qualifiers versus the Blue Jackets, Robertson beat Blue Jackets goaltender Joonas Korpisalo for his first NHL goal in a 4–3 overtime loss. In doing so, he became the third player in franchise history to record a playoff goal before their 19th birthday, the other two being Jack Hamilton in 1943 and Ted Kennedy (1944).

Career statistics

Regular season and playoffs

International

References

External links

2001 births
Living people
American sportspeople of Filipino descent
Ice hockey players from California
People from Arcadia, California
Peterborough Petes (ice hockey) players
Toronto Maple Leafs draft picks
Toronto Maple Leafs players
Toronto Marlies players
American people of Scottish descent